Personalities is a set of miniatures published by Ral Partha.

Contents
Personalities is a line of 25mm fantasy miniatures designed by Tom Meier, each containing one to three pieces.

Reception
John Rankin reviewed Personalities in The Space Gamer No. 60. Rankin commented that "While one could do no better than to build a collection entirely of Personalities, the real beauty of the line is that each figure or small set is a stand-alone item. Each set provides the basis for either one's own character (the mounted and dismounted poses are a boon here), or for a unique encounter within a campaign setting."

25mm Personalities was awarded the Charles S. Roberts Award for "Best Fantasy or Science Fiction Figure Series of 1984".

References

See also
List of lines of miniatures

Miniature figures
Origins Award winners